Golden Tee Golf is a golf arcade game series by Incredible Technologies. Its signature feature is the use of a trackball to determine the power, direction and curve of the player's golf shot. Play modes include casual 18-hole golf, closest to the pin, and online tournaments. One of the longest running arcade game series, Golden Tee has maintained a large following and spawned a competitive tournament scene.

History 
The Golden Tee series began as a project at Incredible Technologies to create a large scale golf simulator for sizable family entertainment centers. The idea was scrapped, but not before programmer Larry Hodgson had already written software to create virtual golf courses. Rather than discard his work, Hodgson retooled the concept to develop a golf game for regular arcade cabinets. He worked with co-designer Jim Zielinski, who initially rendered the courses using Deluxe Paint. Instead of a regular joystick and buttons for controls, they used a trackball, which Incredible Technologies had previously used for Capcom Bowling.

The first Golden Tee was play-tested in a bar, a venue which would become the most popular location for Golden Tee cabinets. Released in 1989, the first iteration was sold exclusively as a kit that could be used to convert existing arcade machines to Golden Tee. It sold relatively well, but the series would find greater success with Golden Tee 3D several years later. The 1995 Peter Jacobson's Golden Tee 3D Golf (featuring Peter Jacobsen) was the first in the series to support online networked play. Rather than being networked to each other, the cabinets were all linked to a central computer which compared scores for tournament play. The first test tournament, held on 24 game cabinets in the Chicago area from November 24 to December 17, 1995, awarded real money to the winners, including a $1,000 grand prize. The first "real world" tournament was held mid-June to July 7, 1996, on 145 cabinets across six states, and was considered a major success. By the end of 1996, 1,250 cabinets were installed across 32 states. The tournament gave rise to a large competitive play scene for the franchise. Ryan Bourgeois has won the US national championship three times.

Since Golden Tee 3D, Incredible Technologies has released a new entry in the series to arcades every year. Versions of the game have also been published for the original PlayStation, Microsoft Windows, iOS and Android. A plug-n-play dedicated console version has also been released.

See also 
PGA Tour Golf Team Challenge

References

External links

Google Play Golden Tee Golf

1989 video games
Arcade video games
Golf video games
Trackball video games
Video game franchises
Video games developed in the United States